Public Property is a 2017 Nigerian movie directed by Tope Alake and Ashionye Michelle Raccah.

Plot 
The movie features a young man who plays fast and loose with women before dumping them. He tried it on another woman and was in trouble because he never meet a lady that would give him a hard time before.

Cast
 Ashionye Michelle Raccah
 Femi Jacobs
 Kiki Omeili
 Okey Uzoeshi
 Omowunmi Dada
 Paul Adams
 Sika Osei

References

Nigerian drama films
2017 films